Bent is a census-designated place in Otero County, New Mexico, United States. Its population was 119 as of the 2010 census. Bent has a post office with ZIP code 88314. U.S. Route 70 passes through the community.

History
A post office called Bent has been in operation since 1906. The community has the name of George Bent, a businessperson in the local mining industry.

Demographics

Education
Bent is within the Tularosa Municipal Schools district.

References

Census-designated places in New Mexico
Census-designated places in Otero County, New Mexico